Jean Boht (born Jean Dance; 6 March 1932) is an English actress, most famous for the role of Nellie Boswell in Carla Lane's sitcom Bread.

Early life and career
Boht was born in Bebington, Cheshire (now in Merseyside) and was a pupil at Wirral Grammar School for Girls. She trained at the Liverpool Playhouse. In a career spanning the period from 1962 to the present day, she has appeared largely in television productions such as Softly, Softly (1971), Some Mothers Do 'Ave 'Em (1978), Grange Hill (1978), Last of the Summer Wine (1978) Boys from the Blackstuff (1982), Scully (1984), Juliet Bravo in the mid-1980s, and Bread (1986–91).  In 1989, she was the subject of This Is Your Life, and in 2008 she made a guest appearance in BBC1's daytime TV soap, Doctors.

On stage, Boht appeared with Jeremy Irons in Embers (2006) at the Duke of York's Theatre in London.

Boht also appeared in the film Mothers and Daughters (2004), and starred in Chris Shepherd's award-winning short film Bad Night for the Blues (2010).

Personal life
Her first marriage to William Boht ended in divorce; she then married conductor/composer Carl Davis in 1970; they have two daughters.

Filmography

Film

Television

Video games

References

External links
 

1932 births
Living people
English television actresses
English soap opera actresses
English stage actresses
People from Bebington
Actresses from Cheshire
People educated at Wirral Grammar School for Girls